299 Queen Street West, also known as Bell Media Queen Street or Bell Media Studios, is the headquarters of the television/radio broadcast hub of Bell Canada's media unit, Bell Media, and is located at the intersection of Queen Street West and John Street in Downtown Toronto, Ontario, Canada. The building previously served as the headquarters of CTVglobemedia until Bell Canada acquired CTV again in 2011 as well as CHUM Television, a division of CHUM Limited, until CTV acquired CHUM in 2007, and was once known as the CHUM-City Building. It is now head offices and downtown Toronto studios for Bell Media.

With its 1913 neo-Gothic terra cotta façade, the building is designated as a heritage property by the City of Toronto's Heritage Preservation Services under the Ontario Heritage Act and has served as a broadcast facility since 1987.

Overview 
The building serves as the official headquarters of Bell Canada's media unit, Bell Media, as well as the home of various Bell Media television properties, most of which were originally owned by CHUM, although some properties that CTV already owned prior to 2007 have moved some or all of their operations here since then as well. Current occupants include CTV Drama Channel, BNN Bloomberg, CP24, CTV Comedy Channel, E!, Investigation Discovery, CTV Life Channel, MTV, MTV2, Much (formerly MuchMusic) and CTV Sci-Fi Channel. In addition, selected CTV programs, including etalk, The Marilyn Denis Show, and The Social are produced at the building and selected network offices are located here.

Aside from the CTV network programming, Toronto station CFTO-TV has relatively little presence at the Queen Street facility.  The primary studios for CTV Toronto, and the CTV network's national operations are located at 9 Channel Nine Court at Highway 401 and McCowan Road in Scarborough, where many of Bell Media's other co-owned channels such as CTV News Channel, Discovery Channel Canada, TSN, and their respective offshoot channels, as well as the master controls for the CTV stations in Eastern Canada, are located (see below).

Group tours of the facilities are held by email request.

History and architecture 

The five-storey building was originally constructed as the headquarters of the Methodist Church of Canada in 1913 by Burke, Horwood and White. The Methodists joined with two other denominations to form the United Church of Canada in 1925, for which the building served as the headquarters until 1959. By this time the Ryerson Press, originally the publishing arm of the Methodist Church, had grown to occupy the entire building.

CHUM Limited & CTVglobemedia
In 1979, family owned CHUM (then solely a radio network) purchased the rest of Citytv to which it did not yet own, which prompted the building purchase by CHUM in 1985. Toronto architecture firm Quadrangle was hired to restore and renovate the building into an innovative broadcast hub. After two years of outfitting for it broadcast operations, it was re-opened in May 1987 as the new headquarters for the company and its various outlets, including Citytv Toronto (which was previously located at 99 Queen St. East).

The building's east wall was decorated with an actual older style news truck seemingly bursting out of the building; the front tires of the truck can still be seen spinning regularly.  From the time the truck was erected there, it originally bore the old "CityPulse Live-Eye" decal; which has been replaced and overhauled with the "CP24 Breaking News" decal following the acquisition by CTVglobemedia.

Previously, the northwest corner of the building used to contain a Speakers' Corner videobooth, where for a dollar anyone could record two minutes of oneself. The booth was removed as part of renovations and upgrades to the MuchMusic studios in 2010, and the space where the video booth was located has since been enclosed and is used as production space for The Social.

While the outside facade has been restored and remains intact, the building's interior has been modernized into one of the world's most innovative media complexes. 299 Queen Street West was designed to have no TV studios; the entire building was rigged for audio and video. The building has been engineered so that public space, working areas, offices, stairwells, and even the parking lot may all be used as optimal shoot locations. Many television shows produced by the various outlets operating out of the building over the years, such as Citytv's Breakfast Television, CityLine and the former Electric Circus, were filmed live on the ground floor. The ground floor at the corner of Queen and John features giant glass sliding partitions so that the building can be open to the street. The studios formerly used for MuchMusic are now used for The Social, and the studio used for CityLine and Breakfast Television on Citytv, then briefly for eTalk on CTV, is now used for The Marilyn Denis Show.

The annual MuchMusic Video Awards show is/was held as a street party that takes place in the parking lot, studios, rooftop, as well as Queen and John Streets adjacent to the building. Queen and John is subsequently shut down from the early-afternoon into the evening on the day the show is/was scheduled to take place.

299 Queen Street West served as the national broadcast headquarters for the 2007 Live Earth concert, with several CTVgm-owned media outlets and personalities collaborating to broadcast the live event nationally for 28 hours. The building also served as the headquarters for CTV's multi-platform coverage of the 32nd Toronto International Film Festival in September 2007, acting as the launching pad of red carpet coverage, galas, film parties, film premieres, festival breaking news, and other related events. Various corporate divisions, such as eTalk, Star!, MuchMusic, MTV Canada, Bravo!, FashionTelevisionChannel and Canada AM, collaborated on the event coverage.

Bell Media era

Although acquired by Bell Media together with other CHUM entities, the Canadian Radio-television and Telecommunications Commission required CTVgm to sell Citytv Toronto and four other Citytv stations in Canada to Rogers Media in 2007. Since then, the Citytv signage at the front building was replaced with an eTalk logo (since removed); the Citytv logos on the landmark mural behind the former Virgin Mobile previously known as the Much store and the CHUM-City Store prior to that were replaced and overhauled with various logos of Bell Media's co-owned television channels, as well as the logo for CTV's entertainment news program eTalk shown one dish (since removed); and the main Citytv signage on the building's east façade was replaced with a CTV logo and a private balcony, looking out from the company's boardroom. Additionally the Bravo sign (no confusion with the US version, at Rockefeller Center) above the CP24 studios was replaced with a Bell Media sign after the acquisition by Bell Canada. Citytv Toronto officially moved out of 299 Queen Street West into its new home at 33 Dundas Street East on September 8, 2009.

It was announced in 2008 that Toronto radio operations including, CHUM (AM) and CHUM-FM, would be relocating to adjacent building 250 Richmond Street West. The iconic 'CHUM Dial 1050 / Radio 1045' sign was unveiled on June 15, 2009 and they officially moved on August 19, 2009.

2010–present

BNN later moved into the building on December 6, 2010, and uses the space previously utilized by Citytv's CityNews department, the BNN newsroom is adjacent to that of CP24's newsroom.

On July 30, 2013, Bell Media announced that CFRB and CKFM-FM would be moving to the adjacent building 250 Richmond Street West, (part of the Bell Media Queen Street complex) from 2 St. Clair Avenue West. This marked the end of CFRB's 49-year tenure at their 2 St. Clair Avenue West studios. The move took place on May 10, 2014.

In 2016, 299 Queen West received a landmark designation from the Ontario Association of Architects.

Other Bell Media facilities in Toronto
Alongside 299 Queen Street West, other Bell Media properties are operated from other facilities in the Toronto area:

 In mid-2015 it was announced the Virgin Mobile at much store would become a new street front facility for Much Digital Studios as part of their multi-channel new media network. The facility is part of the Bell Media Queen Street complex but is not directly connected to any other building. It had previously been the expanded ChumCity Store (relocated from within the ground-floor studio at 299, when not in use for shows like Breakfast Television or Electric Circus), as well as the first location for Moses Znaimer's MZTV Museum of Television.
 Studios for Bell Media's Toronto-based radio channels including 104.5 CHUM-FM, 99.9 Virgin Radio, Newstalk 1010, and Downtown Toronto studios for TSN Radio 1050, are currently located at 250 Richmond Street West at Richmond and Duncan streets which is adjacent and connected to 299 Queen Street West by bridge to 260 Richmond Street West.
 Several other Bell Media television channels, including CTV's flagship station, CTV Toronto, along with CTV News Channel, TSN, TSN2 and Discovery Channel, as well as the master controls for the CTV and CTV 2 stations in Alberta, Southern Ontario, and Eastern and Atlantic Canada (including CTV 2 Windsor, CTV 2 London, CTV 2 Barrie, CTV 2 Ottawa, CTV 2 Atlantic, CTV 2 Alberta, CTV Winnipeg, CTV Kitchener, CTV Northern Ontario, CTV Ottawa and CTV Montreal) as well as some of the technical operations for TSN Radio 1050 are operated from 9 Channel Nine Court in Agincourt located at Highway 401 and McCowan Road. Additionally, TSN Radio 1050's studios for television syndication of its radio programs are located inside 9 Channel Nine Court.

References

External links 

 Emporis.com: The ChumCity Building, Toronto

Office buildings completed in 1913
Buildings and structures in Toronto
Mass media company headquarters in Canada
Bell Media
Gothic Revival architecture in Toronto
Television studios in Canada
United Church of Canada
City of Toronto Heritage Properties
1913 establishments in Ontario